Korean armor is armor that was traditionally used in ancient times by Koreans, those fighting in and on behalf of Korea, or Koreans fighting overseas. Examples of armor from the Korean Peninsula date back to at least the Korean Three Kingdoms period. Depending on the tactical situation, Korean armor also included horse armor and other kinds of early anti-ballistic armor before the 20th century.

Introduction

Korean armor was mainly dedicated to protect against missiles, since the mountainous terrain made field battles either rare or very hazardous in comparison to many other countries; generally for historical Koreanic countries, the defense or the taking of fortifications was the typical way of warfare. 

The earliest variants of armour used by Proto-Koreanic tribes appeared during the Bronze Age and were likely made of animal skins, bone or wood. The earliest findings of iron armour were from Gaya and Goguryeo, while bone armour could be found in Baekje. 

Metallic armor was relatively widespread during the Three Kingdoms period due to constant warfare, but its usage declined once Korea was unified and Japanese pirates or steppe nomads became the main concerns. Following the collapse of United Silla in the 10th century and its takeover by Goryeo, the warfare style more common type to the Central and Northern parts of Korea along with the use of lighter armours took over. This resulted in the general abandonment of the heavy armours typically used by the southern states. 

The first known use of iron plate mail in Korea was used by the Gaya Confederacy between 42 and 562 AD. A large number of iron and steel artifacts, including iron armor, iron horse armor such as helmets and bits, and smaller iron ingots (often used as money), have been found in the Daeseong-dong tombs in Gimhae. Gimhae (김해, 金海) literally means "Sea of Iron", as if the city's name symbolizes the abundance of iron in the area. Surviving examples are currently on display at the Gimhae National Museum in South Korea.

Korean warfare was often based on harsh terrain and the firepower imposed on the enemy from high ground usually in the form of composite bows and later gunpowder weapons, while cavalry superiority was favored against the constant Jurchen raids during the Joseon dynasty. Fighting against the much more numerous forces of China and Japan, Koreans favored mobility and ranged tactics which limited the reliance upon vastly armored units despite a strong inclusion of melee training.

During later periods, Korean armor also included forms of brigandine, chain mail, and scale armor. Due to the cost of iron and steel equipment that were often too high for peasant conscripts, helmets were not always full steel and stiffened leather caps were not uncommon. 

Korean armor pieces, from top to bottom, typically consisted of a helmet or a cap, a heavy main armor coat with pauldrons or shoulder and underarm protection, leg coverings (supplemented by the skirting from the main coat), groin protection, and limb protection. In terms of armament, Korean militaries employed heavy infantry equipped with swords or spears along with shields, pikemen, archers, crossbowmen, and versatile heavy cavalry capable of horse archery. Korean naval warfare saw large deployments of heavy wooden shields as a means of protecting personnel on the top decks of Korean ships. 

After the rise of the Joseon Dynasty, Korean combat armor saw change once from mainly using chainmail, plated mail and lamellar to mostly brigandine. By the time of the Mid-Joseon Dynasty, provincial troops were equipped with padded armor while the central units could afford metal-made armour.

Three Kingdoms Period
Korean armor during the Korean Three Kingdoms Period consisted of two major styles: the 'Chalgap' lamellar armor similar to the ones used by the equestrian steppe nomads and Sinitic empires to the west and plate armor, found in the Gaya Confederation and Silla. The lamellar often consisted of bronze, iron, bone, or stiffened leather; plates were always of iron, steel, or bronze. The best-preserved armors from the three kingdoms period originate almost exclusively from the Gaya confederacy. The armor from Gaya is the best example of plate armor from ancient times, rivaling those of the Mediterranean basin from the same period. These Gaya-style plate armors are categorized into three types- one is made by joining vertical steel bands to form a single plate, another by joining horizontal bars, and the other by putting small triangular steel pieces together. The first type is found in Gaya and Silla, while most examples for the other two are located in Gaya, and some have been found in northern Baekje. Similar styles have also been found in Kyushu and Honshu, Japan.

Goguryeo armor was primarily of lamellar armor, made of small steel plates woven together with a cord. Ancient tombs of the Jjoksaem District of Hwango-dong, Gyeongju, North Gyeongsang, uncovered the first example in 2009. Goguryeo murals found in North Korea also shed light on what Goguryeo's armor looked like.

Goryeo Dynasty Armour
During the Goryeo-era, a unique type of armor, called Durumagi emerged as the main armor for the Korean armies up until the early Joseon period in the 15th century. The opponents of Goryeo weren't heavily armored soldiers of other Koreanic states anymore. The trend shifted towards armor that made units mobile and responsive to a conflict with nomadic Mongolic or semi-nomadic and sedentary Tungusic tribes to the North. The Durumagi is a simple overcoat or robe with scale armor inside forming dots on the outside. Commonly these scales are made from leather, or iron, but some of them are shaped like leaves or coated with mercury or black lacquer.

It is suggested  that during a period of rule under the Mongol Empire, Korea (then under the late Goryeo Dynasty) began to see a number of changes to its military. Japanese paintings of Korean/Mongol warriors during the two Mongol invasions of Japan (1274 and 1281 AD) show the invasion forces made up largely of Mongols, Korean naval infantry, Tungusic allies and Chinese conscripts with shields and Mongol-style armor elements. The shields do not appear to have lasted as an influence, but examples of Joseon-era Korean armor often show adoptive influences from the Mongol period, such as the helmet with the wide brim.

General Chonji wore the gyeongbeongap (경번갑/鏡幡甲).

Joseon dynasty armour
Armor from the Joseon dynasty can be classified into roughly two time periods, the early dynasty (c.15~16th centuries) and the late dynasty (c. 17th~19th centuries). The exact transition point from the early to late dynasty armor remains unresolved. Still, it appears to be around the Japanese invasions of Korea (1592–1598) and the Manchu invasion of Korea, the two and only total wars that Korea faced during the Joseon Dynasty. Throughout both periods, however, padded armor (eomshimgap) was popular among the common soldiers, as Joseon required peasant conscripts to provide their equipment and the armor offered body protection at a low price. Sets of leather armor are called Pigabju. Metallic armor was largely seen within units stationed in the capital, which formed the main striking power of the Joseon land forces.

In the early dynasty, the Joseon Army and Navy wore chain mail and plate armour from the late Goryeo dynasty. In contrast, lamellar armor, the traditional form of Korean armor, also persisted with some influences from the Mongols received during the 13~14th centuries. A complete metallic armor set was composed of a helmet bearing much resemblance with regards to European kettle hats with attached neck defenses of mail or lamellar, a body armor reaching down to the thighs or knees, and a set of shoulder guards which protected the upper arm as well.

In the late dynasty, brigandine or Dujeong-gaps became the primary Korean armor and often reached below the knees when worn, and the helmet assumed a conical shape. The elite soldiers wore the brigandine with metal plates, the Pengbaesu, and the cavalry, the Gabsa, while peasant soldiers wore them with leather plates. The rest did not change much as the dynasty did not experience any war after the Manchu invasions. In the mid-19th century, however, there was an attempt to develop anti-ballistic armor called Myeonje baegab. It was made by sewing sheets of textiles and cotton and combining them into a thick vest to respond to the overwhelming firepower of rifles fielded by Western powers such as France and the United States. Although this attempt was partially in line with the current method of producing anti-ballistic vests, it does not appear to have proved effective.

See also
Korean sword
Korean knife
Korean martial arts
Plated mail - armours similar to Gyeongbeon-gap (경번갑/鏡幡甲)

References

External links
 Silk Road Designs Armoury --Brigandine
 Silk Road Designs Armoury --Armours of Scales
Armor from Goryeo Dynasty
Iron Armour
 about Korean plated mail (lang. Korean)

East Asian armour
Military equipment of Korea
Military history of Korea